Prince Edward—Lennox was an electoral riding in Ontario, Canada. It was created in 1933 before the 1934 election. In 1990 it was renamed and redistributed as Prince Edward—Lennox—South—Hastings. In 1996 it was redistributed and merged into the riding of Prince Edward—Hastings before the 1999 election.

Members of Provincial Parliament

References

Former provincial electoral districts of Ontario